Baatsagaan (Baa white) is a sum (district) of Bayankhongor Province in southern Mongolia. The area is 7447 km2, and the population was 3568 in 2006.

The center of this sum is Bayansair village, located 125 km from the administrative center of the province (aimak) - the city of Bayankhongor and 625 km from the capital of the country - Ulaanbaatar. The climate is sharply continental.

References 

Populated places in Mongolia
Districts of Bayankhongor Province